Stygiomysis is a genus of crustaceans belonging to the monotypic family Stygiomysidae.

The species of this genus are found in Caribbean.

Species:

Stygiomysis aemete 
Stygiomysis clarkei 
Stygiomysis cokei 
Stygiomysis holthuisi 
Stygiomysis hydruntina 
Stygiomysis ibarrae 
Stygiomysis major

References

Crustaceans